An alphabetical list of films produced in the Republic of the Congo:

C

Chapelle, La (1980)
Chasse à l'aigrette en Afrique (1911) 
Corps et l'esprit, Le (1977)

D

Der Leone have sept cabeças (1971) 
Dernier des Babingas, Le (1990) 
Décision, La (1987)

F

Festival panafricain d'Alger (1970)

I

Illusions (1970)

K

Konga Yo (1962)

M

M'Pongo (1982)
Manioc (1983) 
Mwana keba (1970)

R

Rançon d'une alliance, La (1974)

T

Tenrikyo, une tradition en toge noire (2006)

V

Voyage à Ouaga (2001)

External links
 Congolese film at the Internet Movie Database

Congo